The Accra Ghana Temple is the 117th operating temple of the Church of Jesus Christ of Latter-day Saints (LDS Church).

History
The building of the Accra Ghana Temple was announced on February 16, 1998. Years before the temple was announced, LDS Church president Gordon B. Hinckley had promised members in the area they would someday have a temple close by. When the temple was announced Hinckley also told those in attendance that the church had been trying to find a place to build a temple in Ghana for five years. The temple in Accra is the second of three temples built in Africa.

The first Mormon missionaries came to Ghana in 1978. Many of the people present at the announcement of the temple had been some of the first converts in Ghana.

A site dedication and groundbreaking ceremony was held on November 16, 2001. Russell M. Nelson, a member of the Quorum of the Twelve Apostles, led the ceremony. The vice president of Ghana, Aliu Mahama, as well as other officials, participated in the groundbreaking ceremony and a radio station and Ghana Television covered the event. The exterior of the temple is made of Namibia Pearl Granite.

The temple was open to the public from December 3rd through 20th, 2003. During the tour, people were able to see the craftsmanship utilized in the interior of the temple. All of the materials used in the building of the temple were from the area. Moldings in the temple were made of native makore wood, skilled men in the area handcrafted the furniture and the art-glass windows reflect the culture. The vice president of Ghana as well as many other officials took tours through the temple.

Hinckley dedicated the Accra Ghana Temple on January 11, 2004.

There is a stake center and Missionary Training Center on the grounds. While all members of the church with a valid temple recommend are able to visit the temple, it primarily serves members in Benin, Ghana, the Ivory Coast, Liberia, Sierra Leone, and Togo.

In 2020, like all the church's other temples, the Accra Ghana Temple was closed in response to the coronavirus pandemic.

See also

 Billy Johnson (Mormon)
 Comparison of temples of The Church of Jesus Christ of Latter-day Saints
 List of temples of The Church of Jesus Christ of Latter-day Saints
 List of temples of The Church of Jesus Christ of Latter-day Saints by geographic region
 Temple architecture (Latter-day Saints)
 The Church of Jesus Christ of Latter-day Saints in Ghana

References

External links
 Official Accra Ghana Temple page
 Accra Ghana Temple at ChurchofJesusChristTemples.org

Temples (LDS Church) completed in 2004
Buildings and structures in Accra
Religious buildings and structures completed in 2003
Temples (LDS Church) in Africa
The Church of Jesus Christ of Latter-day Saints in Ghana
2004 establishments in Ghana